Führer is a German term meaning leader or guide. It was used as a political title, and later held as a government office by Adolf Hitler during the Weimar and Nazi periods.

Führer, Fuhrer or Fuehrer may also refer to:

People with the name

 Alois Anton Führer (1853–1930), a German Indologist
 Bruce A. Fuhrer (b. 1930), an Australian mycologist
 Christian Führer (1943–2014), a German pastor and leading figures of the Peaceful East German revolution 1989
 Robert Führer (1807–1861), a Czech composer
 Hansruedi Führer (b. 1937), a Swiss football player

Title
Führer of the National Socialist German Workers' Party

See also
 Der Fuehrer's Face, a 1943 animated short film by Walt Disney Productions, featuring Donald Duck